Mario Biancalana (born 14 September 1902, date of death unknown) was a Brazilian fencer. He competed in the individual and team épée events at the 1948 Summer Olympics.

References

External links
 

1902 births
Year of death missing
Brazilian male épée fencers
Olympic fencers of Brazil
Fencers at the 1948 Summer Olympics